Algeria and Serbia maintain diplomatic relations established between Algeria and SFR Yugoslavia in 1962, following Algeria's independence. Algeria has an embassy in Belgrade. Serbia has an embassy in Algiers.

History
Between 1916 and 1919, a military cemetery containing the bodies of 324 Serbs was established Dély Ibrahim. At the time in several coastal towns and villages in Algeria were several French military hospitals where the wounded and exhausted Serbian soldiers were being treated.

See also 
 Foreign relations of Algeria 
 Foreign relations of Serbia
 Yugoslavia and the Non-Aligned Movement
 Algeria–Yugoslavia relations
 Yugoslavia and the Organisation of African Unity

References

External links 
  Serbian Ministry of Foreign Affairs about relations with Algeria 
  Serbian Ministry of Foreign Affairs: direction of the Serbian embassy in Algiers
 
  Serbian Ministry of Foreign Affairs: direction of the Algeria embassy in Belgrade 

 
Serbia
Bilateral relations of Serbia